Akjoujt is one of the districts (Arabic: دوائر إنتخابية) represented in the National Assembly, the unicameral chamber of the Parliament of Mauritania. The district currently elects one deputy using a two-round system. Its boundaries correspond to those of the department of Akjoujt, in the wilaya of Inchiri.

Historic representation

Election results

2018

References

Electoral districts of Mauritania